Murray Barracks was a barracks for the British Army garrisoned in Admiralty, Central in Hong Kong. It was named after Sir George Murray, the Master-General of the Ordnance at the time of construction.

Location
It was situated between present Garden Road and Cotton Tree Drive. The Barracks was located at present Asia Pacific Centre and the Officer's Quarters, also known as Officer's Mess, was located at present Bank of China Tower, close to Queen's Road, (present-day Queensway). Across Garden Road was Murray Parade Ground and Queen's Road North Barracks, which was later known as Wellington Barracks.

Further west of the parade ground, behind Battery Path, stood the Murray Battery.

Officer's Quarter

The quarter was known as Officer's Mess in the early days of Hong Kong. It was later renamed Murray House. Before the construction of Bank of China Tower, Murray House was dismantled brick-by-brick in the mid-1980s and later rebuilt in Stanley.

See also
 Osborne Barracks
 Murray Road
 Murray Building
 British Forces Overseas Hong Kong

References

External links
 Central and Western Heritage Trail – Old Site of Murray Parade Ground

Military of Hong Kong under British rule
Admiralty, Hong Kong
Central, Hong Kong
Barracks in Hong Kong
Former buildings and structures in Hong Kong
Parade grounds